Gregory Ceannanach, early Irish missionary, fl. c. 490-500?

Biography

Ceannach's original name is said to have been Gregory, the former name only associated with him after his death.

He was a very early Christian missionary who worked in what is now called Connemara in the late 5th/early 6th centuries. He may be associated with the western mission of Saint Patrick.

Places associated with im include An Cartrún, Baile na Cille, some three km north of Cleggan. A medieval church set within traces of a rectangular enclosure is dedicated to him. A second church dedicated to him is located on Inishmore, which, according to Previte, "is considered to be one of the most ancient and perfect of all the ecclesiastical remains on the island"

From him is also said to derive the name Gregory's Sound, the sea passage between Inishmore and Inishmaan.

Folklore in the parish of Ballinakill states that Ceannach's mission was the first in this part of Ireland, which was still pagan. The tradition stated that this infuriated a local king, who seized him and had him beheaded close to the eastern extremity of Cleggan. Lore has it that he then picked up his head and took it to the Holy Well in Clooncree where he washed it before lying down to die.

From this incident the village is supposed to derive its name, although An Cloigeann (meaning head or skull), apparently refers to a coastal headland. Gregory's new name, Ceannach, also seems to be derived from this.

A heap of stones pointed out as the site of his death.

See also

 Guairim of Inisbofin
 Mathias of Inis Ní
 Mocán
 Gormgal of Ardoileán, died. 1017/1018.

References

 A Guide to Connemara's Early Christian Sites, Anthony Previte, Oughterard, 2008. 

Christian clergy from County Galway
5th-century Irish priests
Irish Christian missionaries